The S3 was a railway service of the St. Gallen S-Bahn that provided hourly service between  and , in the Swiss canton of St. Gallen. THURBO, a joint venture of Swiss Federal Railways and the canton of Thurgau, operated the service. It was replaced by a lengthened S5 as part of the December 2021 timetable change.

Operations 
The S3, S2, S4, and InterRegio 13 combind for service every fifteen minutes between the two cities. In St. Margrethen, trains made a cross-platform connection with the S3 of the Vorarlberg S-Bahn.

History 
In the end, the S8 was extended to Nesslau-Neu St. Johann.

The December 2015 timetable change truncated this to St. Gallen, where it remained through 2021. The line was discontinued with the December 2021 timetable change, as the S5 was extended from St. Gallen to St. Margrethen.

References

External links 

 Fahrplan Ost

St. Gallen S-Bahn lines
Transport in the canton of St. Gallen